The Women's Tour is a women's cycle stage race held in England and Wales, as part of the UCI Women's World Tour. The race is organised by SweetSpot, the company behind the men's Tour of Britain.

History 
Its origins trace back to 2010 when SweetSpot (the company behind the men's Tour of Britain) organised their first women's cycling race, the Horizon Fitness Grand Prix in Stoke-on-Trent. What began as a supporting event for the men's Tour Series – Britain's leading televised cycle race series – grew into a key part of the women's racing scene in Britain, thanks to television coverage on ITV4 in the UK and around the world. In 2018, Britain's leading women's teams took part in the whole series for the first time.

At the launch of the 2013 Tour of Britain, SweetSpot MD Chairman Hugh Roberts and director Guy Elliott announced the company's intentions to create a standalone stage race for the world's top female cyclists in Britain – the first event of its kind.

As a prelude to the inaugural race in 2014, a women's one-day race was held on the final day of the 2013 Tour of Britain in London, won by Hannah Barnes. As history would show, SweetSpot's move was one that the Tour de France and Vuelta a Espana organisers would announce some months later.

Just a week after this SweetSpot received the news that the Women's Tour had been granted a place on the UCI calendar for May 2014, being granted what was the highest possible ranking for a stage race (2.1) at the time. This put it instantly on a par with the world's top races for women. The first edition was a widely acclaimed success, attracting the world's top riders and teams and widespread media coverage for women's cycling in the UK.

While the first edition of the race took place in May (Wednesday 7 - Sunday 11), the second edition in 2015 moved to a mid-June position, a slot it has held on the UCI calendar ever since – with the exception of the 2021 edition, where it was delayed to October due to the COVID-19 pandemic.

In 2016, the race became a part of the inaugural UCI Women's World Tour, the leading series of races for professional women cyclists.

In 2017, the finished in London for the first time in race history, with Belgian rider Jolien D'Hoore winning the stage. Wales hosted the race for the first time in 2018, with the final stage taking place between Dolgellau and Colwyn Bay. The Women's Tour expanded to six days for the first time in 2019. The increase in days also heralded a slight shift of event days, as the race ran from Monday to Saturday.

SweetSpot announced in March 2020 that the planned seventh edition of the race, scheduled to take place between Monday 8 and Saturday 13 June, was postponed owing to the COVID-19 pandemic. The race's Grand Départ in Bicester, Oxfordshire and final stage in Suffolk had already been announced. Organisers said that they "hope to work with the UCI and British Cycling to find an alternative date in the international cycling calendar for the race to take place should conditions permit." On 4 May, the 2020 Tour was cancelled. In February 2021, the 2021 Women's Tour was postponed from June to October.

The 2022 race returned to its traditional calendar slot in June, with a mountain top finish at Black Mountain in the Brecon Beacons.

SweetSpot announced the 2023 race route on 9 March 2023. The race will include five stages and is scheduled to start in Stratford-upon-Avon on June 7, and finish in Birmingham on June 11. SweetSpot warned that the loss of key sponsors had left a shortfall in funding and that urgent additional income was required to ensure that the race could go ahead.

Overall winners

Classification leaders jerseys

Women's Tour facts and figures

Overall winners 
 Seven riders have won the eight editions of the Women's Tour since its inaugural 2014 race
 Lizzie Deignan (GBR) is the sole double champion in race history to date: she won the 2016 and 2019 editions.
 Coryn Rivera (USA) became the first non-European rider to win the race overall when she triumphed in the 2018 edition.
 Katarzyna Niewiadoma (POL, 2017) is the only rider to lead an edition of the race from start to finish.
 The 2022 edition had the closest winning margin, with only one second separating winner Elisa Longo Borghini and runner-up Grace Brown. Longo Borghini's victory made her the oldest winner at 30 years, 184 days.
 Niewiadoma won the 2017 edition by the biggest margin to date: one minute and 18 seconds. She was also the youngest winner at 22 years, 256 days.

Stage winners

 Marianne Vos (NED), Lorena Wiebes (NED) and Jolien D'Hoore (BEL) have won the most stages of the race to date: five.
 Vos (three in 2014), Wiebes (three in 2022, two in 2021), and D'Hoore (two in 2019) are the only riders to win multiple stages of the race in the same year.
 Nine riders have won stages in more than one edition of the race: Vos (2014, 2016 and 2019); D'Hoore (2015, 2017 and 2018); Deignan (GBR, 2015, 2016 and 2019); Wiebes (NED, 2021 and 2022); Christine Majerus (LUX, 2015 and 2016); Amy Pieters (NED, 2016, 2017 and 2019); Lotta Henttala (2016 and 2018); Sarah Roy (AUS, 2017 and 2018) and Niewiadoma (POL, 2017 and 2019).
 Five different riders won stages in each of the race editions except 2014 and 2021.
 Twenty-two different riders have won stages of the Women's Tour – the most recent addition to the list being Longo Borghini at Black Mountain in 2022.
 Thirteen different nationalities have won stages of the Women's Tour. Dutch riders have won the most (fifteen), ten ahead of Belgium.
 Sarah Roy (AUS, stage four 2017 and stage three 2018), Chloe Hosking (AUS, stage three, 2017), Grace Brown (AUS, stage four, 2022), and Coryn Rivera (USA, stage two 2018) are the only non-European stage winners in race history to date.

Host venues

 On average, 300,000 people watch the Women's Tour from the roadside each year.
 An estimated 125,000 fans watched the race's finale in London in 2017 – the race used the same 6.2 km circuit around Regent Street St James, Piccadilly, Strand and Whitehall that featured in the Tour of Britain in 2015, 2016 and 2018.
 Atherstone (four stage starts and one finish) has hosted the race more than any other venue.
 Suffolk has hosted the race more times than any other county: seven.
 Wales hosted its first stage when stage five of the 2018 edition took place between Dolgellau and Colwyn Bay. The country then welcomed the final two days of the 2019 race, which took place in Powys and Carmarthenshire. It again hosted two stages in 2022.

References

External links

 
Cycle races in the United Kingdom
2014 establishments in the United Kingdom
Recurring sporting events established in 2014
Women's road bicycle races
UCI Women's World Tour races